The 1970–71 Yugoslav Cup was the 24th season of the top football knockout competition in SFR Yugoslavia, the Yugoslav Cup, also known as the "Marshal Tito Cup" (Kup Maršala Tita), since its establishment in 1946.

Round one

Napredak Kragujevac 0 - 0 Partizan

(pen. Napredak)

Round of Sixteen

Crvena Zvezda            - Vojvodina Novi Sad       2-0

FK Bor                   - Napredak Krusevac        2-1

Lovcen Cetinje           - Dinamo Zagreb            1-2

Olimpija Ljubljana       - OFK Beograd              1-2aet

Rijeka                   - Hajduk Split             3-2aet

Sloboda Tuzla            - Dubocica Leskovac        1-0

Vardar Skopje            - Radnicki Kragujevac      0-2

Velez Mostar             - Osijek                   5-0

Quarter finals

Crvena Zvezda            - FK Bor                   2-0

Dinamo Zagreb            - Radnicki Kragujevac      2-0

OFK Beograd              - Sloboda Tuzla            1-2

Velez Mostar             - Rijeka                   6-1

Semi finals

Crvena Zvezda            - Velez Mostar             4-0

Sloboda Tuzla            - Dinamo Zagreb            1-0

Finals (First Leg)

Finals (Second Leg)

See also
1970–71 Yugoslav First League
1970–71 Yugoslav Second League

External links
1971–72 Yugoslav Cup details at Rec.Sport.Soccer Statistics Foundation

Yugoslav Cup seasons
Cup
Yugo